The Spotted ridgefin eel (Callechelys eristigma) is an eel in the family Ophichthidae (worm/snake eels). It was described by John E. McCosker and Richard Heinrich Rosenblatt in 1972. It is a marine, tropical eel which is known from the eastern central Pacific Ocean, including Costa Rica, Mexico, and Panama.

The IUCN redlist currently lists the Spotted ridgefin eel as Least Concern, in spite of its limited distribution, due to a lack of known threats or observed population decline.

References

Ophichthidae
Fish described in 1972